The Cimarron River (or , meaning 'Salt River') extends  across New Mexico, Oklahoma, Colorado, and Kansas. The headwaters flow from Johnson Mesa west of Folsom in northeastern New Mexico. Much of the river's length lies in Oklahoma, where it either borders or passes through eleven counties. There are no major cities along its route. The river enters the Oklahoma Panhandle near Kenton, Oklahoma, crosses the southeastern corner of Colorado into Kansas, reenters the Oklahoma Panhandle, reenters Kansas, and finally returns to Oklahoma where it joins the Arkansas River at Keystone Reservoir west of Tulsa, Oklahoma, its only impoundment.

Names and etymology
The river's present name comes from the early Spanish name, which is usually translated as 'River of the Wild Sheep'; previous English names for the river include Grand Saline, Jefferson (in John Melish's 1820 U.S. map), Red Fork, and Salt Fork.

Description

In northeastern New Mexico and in far western Oklahoma, the river is known as the Dry Cimarron River. The Dry Cimarron is not completely dry, but sometimes its water entirely disappears under the sand in the river bed. The Dry Cimarron Scenic Byway follows the river from Folsom to the Oklahoma border. The waterway becomes simply the Cimarron River after being joined by Carrizozo Creek just inside the Oklahoma border, west of Kenton, Oklahoma. Carrizozo Creek also originates in New Mexico and exits into Oklahoma before re-entering New Mexico and then returning to Oklahoma before joining the river. 

In Oklahoma it is further joined by North Carrizo Creek north-northeast of Kenton, Tesesquite Creek further to the east of Kenton, and South Carrizo Creek yet further to the east. It additionally joins with Cold Springs Creek, Ute Canyon Creek, and Flagg Springs Creek before crossing into Kansas. The river flows along the southern edges of Black Mesa, Oklahoma's highest point. As it first crosses the Kansas border, the river flows through the Cimarron National Grassland.

At Guthrie, the river is joined by Cottonwood Creek (Cimarron River tributary), at a site known for frequent flooding.

The Cimarron's water quality is rated as poor because the river flows through natural mineral deposits, salt plains, and saline springs, where it dissolves large amounts of minerals. It also collects quantities of red soil, which it carries to its terminus. Before the Keystone Dam was built, this silt was sufficient to discolor the Arkansas River downstream.

Early explorers
The first Europeans to see the Cimarron River were apparently Spanish conquistadores led by Francisco Vásquez de Coronado in 1541. The Spanish seem to have done little to exploit the area. The Osage tribe claimed most of the territory west of the confluence of the Cimarron and the Arkansas. In 1819 Thomas Nuttall explored the lower Cimarron and wrote a report describing the flora and fauna that he found there. In 1821 Mexico threw off Spanish rule and William Becknell opened the Santa Fe Trail.

Historical notes of interest
One branch of the Santa Fe Trail, known variously as the Cimarron Route, the Cimarron Cutoff, and the Middle Crossing (of the Arkansas River), ran through the Cimarron Desert and then along the Cimarron River. Lower Cimarron Spring on the riverbank was an important watering and camping spot.
In 1831 Comanche Indians killed Jedediah Smith (a famous hunter, trapper, and explorer) on the Santa Fe Trail near the Cimarron River. His body was never recovered.
In 1834 General Henry Leavenworth established Camp Arbuckle (Fort Arbuckle) at the mouth of the Cimarron River. Later known as Old Fort Arbuckle, it was active for only about a year, and its former site is now submerged beneath the Arkansas River. It should not be confused with the later Fort Arbuckle in Garvin County, Oklahoma.
Historic sites along the river include the ruins of Camp Nichols, a stone fort Kit Carson built in 1865 to protect travelers from raids by Plains Indians on the Cimarron Cutoff. It was near present-day Wheeless, Oklahoma.
The old Chisholm Trail crossed the river at Red Fork Station near present-day Dover, Oklahoma.
In the 1890s the Creek Nation Cave along the Cimarron River near Ingalls in the Oklahoma Territory, was a hideout for the Doolin gang, which included the teenage bandits Cattle Annie and Little Britches.
On September 18, 1906, a bridge across the Cimarron near Dover, Oklahoma Territory, collapsed beneath a Rock Island train bound for Fort Worth, Texas from Chicago. The bridge was a temporary structure unable to withstand the pressure of debris and high water. The railroad had delayed replacing it with a permanent structure for financial reasons. Several sources report that over 100 people were killed, but the figure is disputed. The true number may be as low as four.

Notes

See also
List of rivers of Colorado
List of rivers of Kansas
List of rivers of New Mexico
List of rivers of Oklahoma
List of longest rivers of the United States (by main stem)
Cimarron National Grassland
Folsom Falls
Maxwell National Wildlife Refuge (NWR)
Point of Rocks (Kansas)
Santa Fe Trail

References

Further reading
Anshutz, Carrie W. Schmoker; M.W. (Doc) Anshutz. Cimarron Chronicles: Saga of the Open Range. Meade, Kansas: Ohnick Enterprises, 2003. 
Dary, David. The Santa Fe Trail: Its History, Legends, and Lore. New York: Penguin, 2002 (Reissue). 
Hanners, Laverne; Ed Lord. The Lords of the Valley: Including the Complete Text of Our Unsheltered Lives. Norman: University of Oklahoma Press, 1996. 
Hoig, Stan. Beyond the Frontier: Exploring the Indian Country. Norman: University of Oklahoma Press, 1998. 
Schumm, Stanley A. Channel Widening and Flood-Plain Construction along Cimarron River in Southwestern Kansas: Erosion and Sedimentation in a Semiarid Environment. Washington D.C.: Government Printing Office, 1963. ISBN B0007EFJLY
Schumm, Stanley A. River Variability and Complexity. New York: Cambridge University Press, 2005. 
Stovall, John Willis. Geology of the Cimarron River Valley in Cimarron County, Oklahoma. Chicago, 1938.
Woodhouse, S. W. (Eds. John S. Tomer, Michael J. Brodhead). A Naturalist in Indian Territory: The Journals of S.W. Woodhouse, 1849–50 (The American Exploration and Travel Series, Vol 72). Norman: University of Oklahoma Press, 1996.

External links

 Santa Fe Trail Research Site
Mouth of the Cimarron TopoQuest.
Headwaters of the Cimarron TopoQuest.
Cimarron National Grassland USDA Forest Service.
Dry Cimarron Scenic Byway New Mexico Historic Markers.
Kansas connections (Eco-History Trails and Tales)
 Encyclopedia of Oklahoma History and Culture – Cimarron River
 Oklahoma Digital Maps: Digital Collections of Oklahoma and Indian Territory

Rivers of New Mexico
Rivers of Oklahoma
Rivers of Colorado
Rivers of Kansas
Tributaries of the Arkansas River
Rivers of Colfax County, New Mexico
Rivers of Union County, New Mexico
Rivers of Creek County, Oklahoma
Rivers of Osage County, Oklahoma
Rivers of Pawnee County, Oklahoma
Rivers of Tulsa County, Oklahoma
Rivers of Payne County, Oklahoma
Rivers of Logan County, Oklahoma
Rivers of Kingfisher County, Oklahoma
Rivers of Blaine County, Oklahoma
Rivers of Major County, Oklahoma
Rivers of Woods County, Oklahoma
Rivers of Woodward County, Oklahoma
Rivers of Harper County, Oklahoma
Rivers of Beaver County, Oklahoma
Rivers of Cimarron County, Oklahoma
Rivers of Baca County, Colorado
Rivers of Clark County, Kansas
Rivers of Comanche County, Kansas
Rivers of Meade County, Kansas
Rivers of Seward County, Kansas
Rivers of Haskell County, Kansas
Rivers of Grant County, Kansas
Rivers of Stevens County, Kansas
Rivers of Morton County, Kansas